Cheng San Constituency was a single member constituency in Ang Mo Kio, Singapore

The constituency was formed by carving from Serangoon Gardens SMC in 1980. In 1988, it was absorbed into Cheng San Group Representation Constituency.

Member of Parliament

Elections

Elections in 1980s

See also
Cheng San GRC

References
1984 GE's result
1980 GE's result

Ang Mo Kio
Singaporean electoral divisions